Population dynamics is the type of mathematics used to model and study the size and age composition of populations as dynamical systems.

History 
Population dynamics has traditionally been the dominant branch of mathematical biology, which has a history of more than 220 years, although over the last century the scope of mathematical biology has greatly expanded.

The beginning of population dynamics is widely regarded as the work of Malthus, formulated as the Malthusian growth model. According to Malthus, assuming that the conditions (the environment) remain constant (ceteris paribus), a population will grow (or decline) exponentially. This principle provided the basis for the subsequent predictive theories, such as the demographic studies such as the work of Benjamin Gompertz and Pierre François Verhulst in the early 19th century, who refined and adjusted the Malthusian demographic model.

A more general model formulation was proposed by F. J. Richards in 1959, further expanded by Simon Hopkins, in which the models of Gompertz, Verhulst and also Ludwig von Bertalanffy are covered as special cases of the general formulation. The Lotka–Volterra predator-prey equations are another famous example, as well as the alternative Arditi–Ginzburg equations.

Logistic function 
Simplified population models usually start with four key variables (four demographic processes) including death, birth, immigration, and emigration. Mathematical models used to calculate changes in population demographics and evolution hold the assumption ('null hypothesis') of no external influence. Models can be more mathematically complex where "...several competing hypotheses are simultaneously confronted with the data." For example, in a closed system where immigration and emigration does not take place, the rate of change in the number of individuals in a population can be described as:

where  is the total number of individuals in the specific experimental population being studied,  is the number of births and D is the number of deaths per individual in a particular experiment or model. The algebraic symbols ,  and  stand for the rates of birth, death, and the rate of change per individual in the general population, the intrinsic rate of increase. This formula can be read as the rate of change in the population is equal to births minus deaths.

Using these techniques, Malthus' population principle of growth was later transformed into a mathematical model known as the logistic equation:

The formula can be read as follows: the rate of change in the population is equal to growth that is limited by carrying capacity . From these basic mathematical principles the discipline of population ecology expands into a field of investigation that queries the demographics of real populations and tests these results against the statistical models. The field of population ecology often uses data on life history and matrix algebra to develop projection matrices on fecundity and survivorship. This information is used for managing wildlife stocks and setting harvest quotas.

Intrinsic rate of increase 
The rate at which a population increases in size if there are no density-dependent forces regulating the population is known as the intrinsic rate of increase. It is

Thus r is the maximum theoretical rate of increase of a population per individual – that is, the maximum population growth rate. The concept is commonly used in insect population ecology or management to determine how environmental factors affect the rate at which pest populations increase. See also exponential population growth and logistic population growth.

Epidemiology
Population dynamics overlap with another active area of research in mathematical biology: mathematical epidemiology, the study of infectious disease affecting populations. Various models of viral spread have been proposed and analysed, and provide important results that may be applied to health policy decisions.

Geometric populations 

The mathematical formula below can used to model geometric populations. Geometric populations grow in discrete reproductive periods between intervals of abstinence, as opposed to populations which grow without designated periods for reproduction. Say that N denotes the number of individuals in each generation of a population that will reproduce.

When there is no migration to or from the population, 

Assuming in this case that the birth and death rates are constants, then the birth rate minus the death rate equals R, the geometric rate of increase.

where  is the finite rate of increase.

Therefore:  where  is the Finite rate of increase raised to the power of the number of generations (e.g. for  [two generations] → , for  [one generation] → , and for  [before any generations - at time zero] →

Doubling time 

The doubling time of a population is the time required for the population to grow to twice its size. We can calculate the doubling time of a geometric population using the equation:  by exploiting our knowledge of the fact that the population is twice its size after the doubling time.

The doubling time can be found by taking logarithms. For instance:

Or:

Therefore:

Half-life of geometric populations 

The half-life of a population is the time taken for the population to decline to half its size. We can calculate the half-life of a geometric population using the equation:  by exploiting our knowledge of the fact that the population is half its size after a half-life.

where  is the half-life.

The half-life can be calculated by taking logarithms (see above).

Geometric (R) growth constant 

where  is the change in population size between two generations (between generation  and ).

Finite (λ) growth constant

Mathematical relationship between geometric and logistic populations

In geometric populations,  and  represent growth constants (see 2 and 2.3). In logistic populations however, the intrinsic growth rate, also known as intrinsic rate of increase is the relevant growth constant. Since generations of reproduction in a geometric population do not overlap (e.g. reproduce once a year) but do in an exponential population, geometric and exponential populations are usually considered to be mutually exclusive. However, both sets of constants share the mathematical relationship below.

Giving us  and

Evolutionary game theory 

Evolutionary game theory was first developed by Ronald Fisher in his 1930 article The Genetic Theory of Natural Selection. In 1973 John Maynard Smith formalised a central concept, the evolutionarily stable strategy.

Population dynamics have been used in several control theory applications. Evolutionary game theory can be used in different industrial or other contexts. Industrially, it is mostly used in multiple-input-multiple-output (MIMO) systems, although it can be adapted for use in single-input-single-output (SISO) systems. Some other examples of applications are military campaigns, water distribution, dispatch of distributed generators, lab experiments, transport problems, communication problems, among others.

Oscillatory 
Population size in plants experiences significant oscillation due to the annual environmental oscillation. Plant dynamics experience a higher degree of this seasonality than do mammals, birds, or bivoltine insects. When combined with perturbations due to disease, this often results in chaotic oscillations.

In popular culture
The computer game SimCity, Sim Earth and the MMORPG Ultima Online, among others, tried to simulate some of these population dynamics.

See also 

 Delayed density dependence
 Lotka-Volterra equations
 Minimum viable population
 Maximum sustainable yield
 Nicholson–Bailey model
 Pest insect population dynamics
 Population cycle
 Population dynamics of fisheries
 Population ecology
 Population genetics
 Population modeling
 Ricker model
 r/K selection theory
 System dynamics

References

Further reading
 Andrey Korotayev, Artemy Malkov, and Daria Khaltourina. Introduction to Social Macrodynamics: Compact Macromodels of the World System Growth. 
 Turchin, P. 2003. Complex Population Dynamics: a Theoretical/Empirical Synthesis. Princeton, NJ: Princeton University Press.

External links 
 The Virtual Handbook on Population Dynamics. An online compilation of state-of-the-art basic tools for the analysis of population dynamics with emphasis on benthic invertebrates.

Fisheries science
Population ecology
Population models